Ridgeway is a hamlet on the boundary of Brown Edge and Stoke-on-Trent in Staffordshire, England.

References

Hamlets in Staffordshire